Psilus may refer to:
 Psilus (wasp), a genus of wasps in the family Diapriidae
 Psilus, a genus of fishes in the family Eleotridae, synonym of Bostrychus
 Psilus, a genus of beetles in the family Carabidae, synonym of Syleter